Dominique Baeyens (born 21 February 1956) is a Belgian former professional volleyball player and coach.

Honours

As a player
 National championships
 1981/1982  Belgian Cup, with Kruikenburg Ternat

As a coach
 CEV Cup
  2001/2002 – with Knack Roeselare
 CEV Challenge Cup
  1997/1998 – with Knack Roeselare
  1998/1999 – with Knack Roeselare
 National championships
 1991/1992  Belgian Championship, with Maes Pils Zellik
 1992/1993  Belgian Championship, with Maes Pils Zellik
 1993/1994  Belgian Championship, with Maes Pils Zellik
 1999/2000  Belgian Cup, with Knack Roeselare
 1999/2000  Belgian Championship, with Knack Roeselare
 2000/2001  Belgian SuperCup, with Knack Roeselare
 2004/2005  Belgian SuperCup, with Knack Roeselare
 2004/2005  Belgian Cup, with Knack Roeselare
 2004/2005  Belgian Championship, with Knack Roeselare
 2005/2006  Belgian SuperCup, with Knack Roeselare
 2005/2006  Belgian Cup, with Knack Roeselare
 2005/2006  Belgian Championship, with Knack Roeselare
 2006/2007  Belgian Championship, with Knack Roeselare
 2007/2008  Belgian SuperCup, with Knack Roeselare
 2009/2010  Belgian Championship, with Knack Roeselare
 2010/2011  Belgian SuperCup, with Knack Roeselare
 2010/2011  Belgian Cup, with Knack Roeselare

References

External links
 
 Coach profile at Volleybox.net

1956 births
Living people
Sportspeople from Brussels
People from Sint-Agatha-Berchem
Belgian men's volleyball players
Belgian volleyball coaches